The following is the list of films in which K. R. Vijaya has performed. She has acted in almost 500 films.

Filmography

2020's

2010s

2000s

1990s

1980s

1970s

1960s

References

External links 
KR Vijaya at MSI

Indian filmographies
Actress filmographies